Giants is the second studio album by British singer-songwriter Andreya Triana. It was released by Counter Records on 4 May 2015. The lead single, "Gold", was released on 13 March 2015. The album was produced largely by Aqualung, with additional production from Paul Staveley O'Duffy and Mike Peden. It peaked at number 59 on the UK Albums Chart.

Track listing

Personnel
Credits adapted from liner notes.

 Andreya Triana – vocals, glockenspiel
 Matt Hales – guitar, bass guitar, piano, keyboards, programming
 Paul O'Duffy – piano, keyboards, programming
 Josh Wilkinson – piano
 Clifford Carter – keyboards
 Ben Hales – guitar, bass guitar
 Tim Cansfield – guitar
 Ed Hayes – guitar
 Dave Eggar – cello
 Rachel Golub – violin

Charts

References

External links
 

2015 albums
Andreya Triana albums